Hoxton is a ward in the London Borough of Hackney and forms part of the Hackney South and Shoreditch constituency.

The ward stretches from Hoxton Street and Hoxton Square in the East to Old Street and City Road in the South and West and Shoreditch Park and the Regents Canal in the North.

The ward returns three councillors to the borough council, with an election every four years. At the last election on 6 May 2010 Philip Glanville, Clay McKenzie, and Carole Williams all Labour Party candidates, were returned. Turnout was 52%; with 5,150 votes cast.

The population of the ward at the 2011 Census was 15,174.

References

 2002 election results
 2005 by-election result
 2006 election results

External links
 London Borough of Hackney list of constituencies and councillors.
 Labour Party profile of Philip Glanville
 Labour Party profile of Clay McKenzie
 Labour Party profile of Carole Williams

Wards of the London Borough of Hackney
2014 disestablishments in England
2002 establishments in England